Parliamentary elections were held in Iran in 1947. The newly elected parliament was opened on 17 July. The election was a three-way power struggle between Ahmad Qavam, Mohammad Reza Shah and pro-Britain conservative politicians.

Prime Minister Qavam's control over electoral machinery was in many districts challenged by "Imperial Iranian Army officers, independent local magnets and pro-British provincial governors".

A public protest by shopkeepers, bazaaris and university students and headed by Mohammad Mosaddegh among other politicians was held to call for a free elections, however, despite Qavam's promise to hold a free election, it was "rigged" and his Democrat Party of Iran won the majority, including all 12 seats in Tehran.

Fraction members

References

Further reading
Parliamentary Politics in Revolutionary Iran: The Institutionalization of Factional Politics (Hardcover) (Publisher: Gainesville: University Press of Florida, ©1996.) 

Iran
1947 in Iran
Electoral fraud in Iran
National Consultative Assembly elections